William Shaw works as a journalist and writer in the US and in the UK. One of his earlier works is the 1999 book Westsiders: Stories of the Boys in the Hood, which chronicles the attempts of a group of Los Angelenos to become successful hip hop artists.

He worked on Details magazine and remains a contributing editor there. For Details he spent a month in the Utah desert living with Stone Age survivalists, went undercover at cross burnings with the neo-Nazi Christian Identity Movement in Idaho, shot AK-47s with Zionist fundamentalists in upper New York State and spent a week staying at the Church of Scientology Celebrity Center in Hollywood. He started his journalistic career as the Assistant Editor of the punk/goth magazine ZigZag. Since then his work has appeared in publications around the world, including The Times and The Independent. His first book, Travellers, was an oral history of Britain's New Age travellers. That was followed in 1994 by Spying in Guru Land, an account of a year spent as a member of several British religious cults.

His book, Small Ads, based on his Observer column, appeared in 2005 as A Superhero for Hire.

His recent works include police mystery novels based in London in the 1960s; the main characters are Detective Sergeant Breen and Woman Police Constable Tozer.

Shaw's police novel Salt Lane (May 2018) is the first in a new series which features DS Alexandra Cupidi. The novel The Birdwatcher (2016) is set before the events of this book.

William Shaw lives in Brighton, United Kingdom.

Bibliography

Non-fiction
Travellers (1994)
Spying in Guru Land: Inside Britain's Cults (1995)
Westsiders: Stories of the Boys in the Hood (1999)
A Superhero for Hire: True Stories from the Small Ads (2005)
41 Places – 41 Stories (2007)
DS Cathal Breen and WPC Helen Tozer
A Song from Dead Lips [US title: She's Leaving Home] (2013)
A House of Knives [US title: The Kings of London] (2014)
A Book of Scars [US title: A Song for the Brokenhearted] (2015)
Sympathy for the Devil [US title: Play with Fire] (2017)
Standalone Novel featuring DS Cupidi
The Birdwatcher (2016)
DS Alex Cupidi
Salt Lane (2018)
Deadland (2019)
Grave's End (2020)
The Trawlerman (2021)
Writing as GW Shaw
Dead Rich (2022)
The Conspirators (2023)

References
 
http://www.bloomsbury.com/author/william-shaw
http://www.41places.org/

External links
REVIEW : A House of Knives by William Shaw at Upcoming4.me

Year of birth missing (living people)
Living people
British male journalists